Fan Wanzhang (1927 in Qixia, Shandong - August 8, 1952) was a MiG-15 pilot of the People's Republic of China. He was a flying ace during the Korean War, with 8 victories.

A member of the 3rd Fighter Aviation Division, he was also known as Fan Van Chou. He was killed in action on August 8, 1952.

Like all Chinese aces, he received the title Combat Hero in acknowledgement of his service.

See also 
List of Korean War flying aces

References

Sources 

1927 births
1952 deaths
Chinese aviators
Chinese Korean War flying aces
Chinese military personnel of the Korean War
Chinese military personnel killed in the Korean War
Aviators killed by being shot down
Chinese military personnel killed in action